Mormeal ( and) is a townland lying within the civil parish of Kilcronaghan, County Londonderry, Northern Ireland. It lies in the west of the parish with the Altagoan river to its west forming the parish boundary with Ballynascreen. It is bounded by the townlands of: Brackaghlislea, Drumard, Duntibryan, Gortnaskey, Granny, Tamnyaskey. It wasn't apportioned to any of the London livery companies, being kept as church lands.

The townland was part of Tobermore electoral ward of the former Magherafelt District Council, however in 1926 it was part of Tobermore district electoral division as part of the Maghera division of Magherafelt Rural District. It was also part of the historic barony of Loughinsholin.

Etymology
The actual Irish origin of Mormeal is unknown with several different variants provided, most notably by Alfred Munn Moore. The most recent translation as of 2002 states its origin as being; Mír Mhíchíl, meaning Michael's portion. Older origins include:

 Mor-meall meaning "great hillock". Mór Mael(án) in modern Irish.
 Baile mor miol meaning "town of the monsters". 
 Magh-adhair m-bheal (pronounced "mawr-meal") meaning "plain of the fire, or adoration, of the god Belus (the sun)".

History
Along with the townlands of Granny, Tamnyaskey, and Tullyroan, Mormeal comprises the four townlands that make up the Bishop of Derrys lands in the parish. Prior to the Plantation of Ulster, these four townlands constituted the termon (or erenagh) land of the parish, and were known as "Ballintrolla, Derreskerdan, Dirrygrinagh et Kellynahawla". Despite these townlands being in the same location as the later townlands, it is now impossible to match their names accurately.

The ruins of the ancient parish church of Kilcronaghan lie within the townland of Mormeal. In the east of the townland on a hill (438 ft.) lies an ancient ráth, and one on another hill (450 ft.) to the south.

Statistics

See also
Kilcronaghan
List of townlands in Tobermore
Tobermore

References

Townlands of County Londonderry
Civil parish of Kilcronaghan